The Women's Overall in the 2019 FIS Alpine Skiing World Cup involved 35 events in 5 disciplines: downhill (DH), Super-G (SG), giant slalom (GS), slalom (SL) [which included parallel slaloms and city events], and Alpine combined (AC). After this season, city events were discontinued, and a new parallel discipline was created for parallel slaloms and parallel giant slaloms.  

The season was interrupted by the 2019 World Ski Championships, which were held from 4–17 February in Åre, Sweden.

Two-time defending champion Mikaela Shiffrin of the United States set an all-time World Cup record by winning 17 events during the season, shattering Vreni Schneider's all-time record of 14 (set back during the 1988-89 season), and also won the season championships in the disciplines of Super-G, giant slalom, and slalom (the only skier, male or female, to ever win those three disciplines and the overall championship over a single season).

The season finals were held in Soldeu, Andorra.

Standings

See also
 2019 Alpine Skiing World Cup – Women's summary rankings
 2019 Alpine Skiing World Cup – Women's Downhill
 2019 Alpine Skiing World Cup – Women's Super-G
 2019 Alpine Skiing World Cup – Women's Giant Slalom
 2019 Alpine Skiing World Cup – Women's Slalom
 2019 Alpine Skiing World Cup – Women's Combined
 2019 Alpine Skiing World Cup – Men's Overall

References

External links
 Alpine Skiing at FIS website

Women's Overall
FIS Alpine Ski World Cup overall titles